Leonard Joseph "Chico" Marx (March 22, 1887 – October 11, 1961) was an American comedian, actor and pianist. He was the oldest brother in the Marx Brothers comedy troupe, alongside his brothers Adolph ("Harpo"), Julius ("Groucho"), Milton ("Gummo") and Herbert ("Zeppo"). His persona in the act was that of a charming, uneducated but crafty con artist, seemingly of rural Italian origin, who wore shabby clothes and sported a curly-haired wig and Tyrolean hat. On screen, Chico is often in alliance with Harpo, usually as partners in crime, and is also frequently seen trying to con or outfox Groucho. Leonard was the oldest of the Marx Brothers to live past early childhood, the first-born being Manfred Marx who had died in infancy. In addition to his work as a performer, he played an important role in the management and development of the act in its early years.

Early years
Marx was born in Manhattan, New York City, on March 22, 1887. His parents were Sam Marx (called "Frenchie" throughout his life), and his wife, Minnie Schoenberg Marx. Minnie's brother was vaudeville  comedian Al Shean, best known as one half of Gallagher and Shean. The Marx family was Franco-German Jewish. His father was a native of Alsace who worked as a tailor and his mother was from East Frisia in Germany.

Stage persona
Billing himself as Chico (pronounced as "Chicko"), he used an Italian persona for his onstage character. Stereotyped ethnic characters were common with vaudevillians. His questionable Italian ethnicity was specifically referred to twice on film: In their second feature, Animal Crackers, he recognizes someone he knows to be a fish peddler from Czechoslovakia impersonating a respected art collector:

In A Night at the Opera, which begins in Italy, his character, Fiorello, claims not to be Italian, eliciting a surprised look from Groucho:

A scene in the film Go West, in which Chico attempts to placate an Indian chief of whom Groucho has run afoul, has a line that plays a bit on Chico's lack of Italian nationality, but is more or less proper Marxian wordplay:

There are moments, however, where his characters appear to be genuinely Italian; examples include the film The Big Store, in which his character Ravelli runs into an old friend he worked with in Naples (after a brief misunderstanding due to his accent), the film Monkey Business, in which Chico claims his grandfather sailed with Christopher Columbus, and their very first outing The Cocoanuts, where Mr. Hammer (Groucho) asks him if he knew what an auction was, in which he responds "I come from Italy on the Atlantic Auction [Atlantic Ocean]!"  Chico's character is often assumed to be dim-witted, as he frequently misunderstands words spoken by other characters (particularly Groucho). However, he often gets the better of the same characters by extorting money from them, either by con or blackmail; again, Groucho is his most frequent target.

Chico was a talented pianist. He originally started playing with only his right hand and fake playing with his left, as his teacher did so herself. Although he took lessons, Chico was a largely self-taught pianist. As a young boy, he gained jobs playing piano to earn money for the Marx family. Sometimes Chico even worked playing in two places at the same time. He would acquire the first job with his piano-playing skills, work for a few nights, and then substitute Harpo on one of the jobs. (During their boyhood, Chico and Harpo looked so much alike that they were often mistaken for each other.)

In the brothers' last film, Love Happy, Chico plays a piano and violin duet with 'Mr. Lyons' (Leon Belasco). Lyons plays some ornate riffs on the violin; Chico comments, "Look-a, Mister Lyons, I know you wanna make a good impression, but please don't-a play better than me!"

In a record album about the Marx Brothers, narrator Gary Owens stated that "although Chico's technique was limited, his repertoire was not." The opposite was true of Harpo, who reportedly could play only two tunes on the piano, which typically thwarted Chico's scam and resulted in both brothers being fired.

Groucho Marx once said that Chico never practiced the pieces he played. Instead, before performances he soaked his fingers in hot water. He was known for 'shooting' the keys of the piano. He played passages with his thumb up and index finger straight, like a gun, as part of the act. Other examples of his keyboard flamboyance are found in Go West (1940), where he plays the piano by rolling an orange over the keys  and A Night in Casablanca (1946), where he performs a rendition of "The Beer Barrel Polka".

Chico became the unofficial manager of the Marx Brothers after their mother, Minnie, died in 1929. As manager, he negotiated with the studios to get the brothers a percentage of a film's gross receipts—the first deal of its kind in Hollywood which has become common practice today. Furthermore, it was Chico's connection with Irving Thalberg, head of production at Metro-Goldwyn-Mayer, that led to Thalberg's signing the Brothers when they were in a career slump after Duck Soup (1933), the last of their films for Paramount.

For a while in the 1930s and 1940s, Chico led a big band. Crooner Mel Tormé began his professional career singing with the Chico Marx Orchestra. Through the 1950s, Chico occasionally appeared on a variety of television anthology shows and some television commercials, most notably with Harpo (and a cameo appearance by Groucho) in "The Incredible Jewelry Robbery", a pantomime episode of General Electric Theater in 1959; This was the final appearance of the three Marx Brothers.

Pronunciation and origin of name

His nickname (acquired during a card game in Chicago in 1915) was originally spelled Chicko. A typesetter accidentally omitted the 'k', so his name became Chico but the Marxes still pronounced it "Chick-oh", although others sometimes mistakenly pronounced it "Cheek-oh". Numerous radio recordings from the 1940s exist in which announcers and fellow actors mispronounce the nickname, but Chico does not correct them. As late as the 1950s, Groucho used the wrong pronunciation for comedic effect. A guest on You Bet Your Life told the quizmaster she grew up around Chico (California) and Groucho responded, "I grew up around Chico myself. You aren't Gummo, are you?" In most interviews, Groucho is heard correctly pronouncing it "Chicko", as in a Dick Cavett episode with Groucho talking to Dan Rowan.

During Groucho's live performance at Carnegie Hall in 1972, he states that his brother got the name Chico because he was a "chicken-chaser" (early 20th century slang for womanizer).

Gambling

As well as being a compulsive womanizer, Chico had a lifelong gambling habit. His favorite gambling pursuits were card games, horse racing, dog racing, and various sports betting. His addiction cost him millions of dollars by his own account. When an interviewer in the late 1930s asked him how much money he had lost from gambling, he answered, "Find out how much money Harpo's got. That's how much I've lost." Gummo Marx, in an interview years after Chico's death, said: "Chico's favorite people were actors who gambled, producers who gambled, and women who screwed." In reference to Chico's well-known promiscuity, George Jessel quipped, "Chico didn't button his fly until he was seventy."

Chico's lifelong gambling addiction compelled him to continue working in show business long after his brothers had retired in comfort from their Hollywood income, and in the early 1940s, he found himself playing in the same small, cheap halls in which he had begun his career 30 years earlier.  The Marx Brothers' penultimate film, A Night in Casablanca (1946), was made largely for Chico's financial benefit since he had filed for bankruptcy a few years prior. Because of his out-of-control gambling, his brothers finally took the money as he earned it and put him on an allowance, on which he stayed until his death.

Chico had a reputation as a world-class pinochle player, a game he and Harpo learned from their father. Groucho said Chico would throw away good cards (with the knowledge of spectators) to make the play "more interesting". Chico's last public appearance was in 1960, playing cards on the television show Championship Bridge. He and his partner lost the game.

Personal life
Chico was married twice. His first marriage was to Betty Karp in 1917. They had a daughter, Maxine (1918–2009). His first marriage was affected by his infidelity, ending in divorce in 1940; he was very close to his daughter Maxine and gave her acting lessons.

Chico's second marriage was to Mary De Vithas. They married in 1958, three years before his death.

Awards and honors
In the 1974 Academy Awards telecast, Jack Lemmon presented Groucho with an honorary Academy Award to a standing ovation. The award was also for Harpo, Chico, and Zeppo, whom Lemmon mentioned by name. It was one of Groucho's last public appearances.  "I wish that Harpo and Chico could be here to share with me this great honor," he said, naming the two deceased brothers (Zeppo was still alive at the time and in the audience). Groucho also praised the late Margaret Dumont as a great straight woman who never understood any of his jokes.

Illness and death

Chico died of arteriosclerosis at age 74 on October 11, 1961, at his Hollywood home. He was the eldest brother and the first to die. He was survived by his second wife Mary and daughter Maxine (from his first marriage to Betty Karp).

Chico is entombed in the mausoleum at Forest Lawn Memorial Park Cemetery in Glendale, California. Chico's brother Gummo is in a crypt across the hall from him.

Portrayals

Actor Michael Tucci portrayed Chico alongside Gabriel Kaplan as Groucho in the play Groucho (later released on home video under the title Gabe Kaplan as Groucho) originally broadcast on HBO in 1982.

Actors who have portrayed Chico Marx in stage revivals of the Marx Brothers musical plays include Peter Slutsker, Les Marsden and Matt Roper. Frank Lazarus played Chico in a 1990 radio adaptation of Flywheel, Shyster, and Flywheel.

Filmography 

Films
 The Cocoanuts (1929) as Chico
 Animal Crackers (1930) as Signor Emanuel Ravelli
 The House That Shadows Built (1931) as Tomalio
 Monkey Business (1931) as Chico
 Horse Feathers (1932) as Baravelli
 Duck Soup (1933) as Chicolini
 A Night at the Opera (1935) as Fiorello
 A Day at the Races (1937) as Tony
 Room Service (1938) as Harry Binelli 
 At The Circus (1939) as Antonio "Tony" Pirelli
 Go West (1940) as Joe Panello
 The Big Store (1941) as Ravelli
 A Night in Casablanca (1946) as Corbaccio 
 Love Happy (1949) as  Faustino the Great
 The Story of Mankind as Monk (uncredited)

Broadway
 I'll Say She Is
 The Cocoanuts
 Animal Crackers

References

External links

 
 
 
 
 
 
 How to play piano like Chico Marx
 Chico Marx at Marx Brothers.org
 News - The Marx Brothers
 

1887 births
1961 deaths
20th-century American comedians
Male actors from New York City
American male film actors
American comedy musicians
American male comedians
American pianists
Burials at Forest Lawn Memorial Park (Glendale)
American people of German-Jewish descent
Jewish American male actors
Comedians from New York City
Vaudeville performers
Marx Brothers
20th-century American male actors
Jewish American comedians
American male comedy actors
Deaths from aortic dissection
American male pianists
Ethnic humour
20th-century American male musicians